Torstad Chapel is a chapel of the Church of Norway in Nærøysund municipality in Trøndelag county, Norway. It is located in the village of Torstad. It is an annex chapel for the Nærøy parish which is part of the Namdal prosti (deanery) in the Diocese of Nidaros. The wooden church was built in a rectangular style in 1936 using plans drawn up by the architect Arne Sørvig. The church seats about 120 people.

History
The first chapel in Torstad was built in 1936 and it was used as a chapel and also as a school. In 1976, the building was converted into just a chapel.

See also
List of churches in Nidaros

References

Nærøysund
Churches in Trøndelag
Rectangular churches in Norway
Wooden churches in Norway
20th-century Church of Norway church buildings
Churches completed in 1936
1936 establishments in Norway